Tvis Abbey is a former Cistercian monastery in Denmark.

History
The abbey was founded in 1163 by Prince Buris Henriksson (1130-1167), earl of Jutland,  who was the son of  Danish lord Henrik Skadelår and the brother of Swedish King Magnus Henriksson (c. 1130–1161).
It was a daughter house of Herrevad Abbey (Herrevad kloster) in Scania (now in Sweden) and was established with a substantial endowment of property near the village of Holstebro. The abbey was dissolved during the Reformation, probably in 1547.
The abbey church, which served as a parish church, was demolished, apparently in 1698, after which a replacement was set up in the west wing, but that too was demolished after the construction of a new parish church in 1887. Today there are no visible remains apart from the foundations. In 1935, a memorial stone was erected over the site of the altar in the middle of the cemetery.

References

Other Sources
 Andersen, Anders, 1978: Tvis Kloster, online at http://tviskirke.dk/brochure/tviskloster.pdf

External links
Holstebro tourism website 

Cistercian monasteries in Denmark
1163 establishments in Europe
12th-century establishments in Denmark